The 2022–23 season is the Abahani Limited Dhaka's 51st season since its establishment in 1972 and their 15th consecutive season in the Bangladesh Premier League since initiation of the league. The season covering period from 8 October 2022–TBC 2023.

Players

Transfer

In

Out

Competitions

Overall

Overview

Premier League

Results summary

Results by round

Matches

Federation Cup

Group stages

Independence Cup

Group stages

Group C

Knockout stages

Super Cup

Group stages

Statistics

Goalscorers

Source: Matches

References

Abahani Limited Dhaka
Bangladeshi football club records and statistics
2023 in Bangladeshi football
2022 in Bangladeshi football